Events from the year 1843 in Germany.

Incumbents
 Kingdom of Prussia –
 Monarch – Friedrich Wilhelm IV (1840–1861)
 Chief Minister – Ludwig Gustav von Thile (1841–1848)
 Kingdom of Bavaria
 Monarch – Ludwig I (1825–1848)
 Prime Minister – Karl von Abel (1837–1847)
 Kingdom of Saxony – Frederick Augustus (1836–1854)
Kingdom of Hanover – Ernest Augustus (1837–1851)
 Kingdom of Württemberg – William (1816–1864)

Events 

 The Berlin Peace Column is a column located in Mehringplatz in Berlin, Germany. Designed by Christian Gottlieb Cantian and erected in 1843.
 Ohm's acoustic law was proposed by German physicist Georg Ohm.
 The University of Music and Theatre Leipzig founded in 1843 by Felix Mendelssohn.

Births 

 January 8 – Karl Eduard Heusner, Vice-Admiral of the German Imperial Navy (d. 1891)
 January 11 – Adolf Eberle, German painter (d. 1914)
 January 17 – Anton Thraen, German astronomer (d. 1902)
 January 22 – Friedrich Blass, German scholar (d. 1907)
 January 25 – Hermann Schwarz, German mathematician (d. 1921)
 January 26 – Erdmann Encke, German sculptor (d. 1896)
 February 25 – Karl Gussow, German painter (d. 1907)
 March 12 – Ludwig Dahn, German actor (d. 1898)
 March 31 – Bernhard Förster, German teacher (d. 1889)
 April 2 –  Karl Koester, German pathologist (d. 1904)
 April 11 – Johannes Minckwitz, German chess player (d. 1901)
 April 21 – Walther Flemming, German biologist (d. 1905)
 May 8 – Rudolf Mosse, German publisher (d. 1920)
 May 9 – Anton von Werner, German painter (d. 1915)s Renault, French jurist, educator, and Nobel Prize laureate (d. 1918)
 May 22 – Adolf Aron Baginsky, German professor of diseases (d. 1918)
 May 25 – Paul Scheffer-Boichorst, German historian (d. 1902)
 May 30 – Louis Boehmer, German-American agronomist (d. 1896)
 June 4 – Charles Conrad Abbott, German archaeologist (d. 1919)
 June 9-Wilhelm Dames, German paleontologist (d. 1898)
 June 13 – Adolf Neuendorff, German American composer (d. 1897)
 June 14 – Richard Otto Zöpffel, Baltic German church historian and theologian (d. 1891)
 June 23 – Otto Kuntze, German botanist (d. 1907)
 June 23 – Paul Heinrich von Groth (died 1927), German mineralogist
 June 24 – Andreas Ascharin, Baltic-German chessmaster (d. 1896)
 June 25 – Prince Frederick of Hohenzollern-Sigmaringen, Member of the Hohenzollern Sigmaringen family (d. 1904)
 June 28 – Julius Runge, German landscape artist (d. 1922)

 July 29 – Johannes Schmidt, German linguist (d. 1901)
 August 9 – Adolf Mayer, German agricultural chemist (d. 1942)
 August 11 – Louis Gathmann, German American inventor (d. 1917)
 August 12 – Colmar Freiherr von der Goltz, Prussian field marshal (d. 1916)
 August 18 – Moritz Brasch, German philosopher (d. 1895)
 August 24 – Ernst Wülcker, German archivist and lexicographer (d. 1895)
 August 26 – Victor Gardthausen, German ancient historian (d. 1925)
 August 27 – Wilhelm Wisser, German dialectologist (d. 1935)
 August 30 – Carl Theodor Albrecht, German astronomer (d. 1915)
 August 31 – Georg von Hertling, Chancellor of Germany (d. 1919)
 September 5 – Friedrich Reusch, German sculptor (d. 1906)
 September 7 – Otto von Diederichs, German admiral (d. 1918)
 September 11 – Adolf Wach, German jurist (d. 1926)
 September 20 – Julius Lessing, German art historian (d. 1908)
 September 24 – Carl Constantin Platen, German physician (d. 1899)
 October 16 – Johann Friedrich Ahlfeld, German obstetrician and gynecologist (d. 1929)November 7 – Heinrich Friedrich Weber, German physicist (d. 1912)
 November 8 – Moritz Pasch, German mathematician (d. 1930)
 November 13 – Friedrich Albin Hoffmann, German internist (d. 1924)
 November 14 – Theodor Wilhelm Engelmann, German botanist (d. 1909)
 November 15 – Joseph König (chemist), German chemist (d. 1930)
December 11 – Robert Koch, German physician, recipient of the Nobel Prize in Physiology or Medicine (d. 1910)

Deaths 
 March 27 – Karl Salomo Zachariae von Lingenthal, German jurist (b. 1769)
 June 7 – Friedrich Hölderlin, German writer (b. 1770)
 July 2 – Samuel Hahnemann, German physician (b. 1755

References

Bibliography

Years of the 19th century in Germany
Germany
Germany